María Elizabeth Vera (born January 31, 1982, in Buenos Aires, Argentina), professionally known as Lissa Vera, is an Argentine singer-songwriter, composer and actress. She is best known for being a member of Argentine all-female band Bandana. In 2007, she participated in reality show Gran Hermano.

Discography

With Bandana
 See Bandana discography.

Solo

Albums
 ¿Quién dijo? (2005)
 TBA (2008)

Singles
 "¿Quién dijo?" (2005)
 "Ritmo en la Sangre" (2008)

Filmography

Film
 Vivir Intentando (2003) as Lissa

Television

Awards 
 See Bandana awards.

External links 
 
 Lissa Vera at MySpace.
 Official Website of Bandana

1982 births
Living people
Argentine actresses
21st-century Argentine women singers
Singers from Buenos Aires
Bandana (pop band) members